is a Japanese voice actor and singer who has voiced characters in anime, drama CDs, and video games. He was formerly affiliated with I'm Enterprise, Sigma Seven and VIMS. His most notable roles were Shikamaru Nara from Naruto, Souji Okita in the Hakuouki series, X in the Mega Man X series and Yosuke Hanamura from Persona 4.

Biography
Morikubo graduated from Third Junior & Senior High School of Nihon University in 1992, and dropped out of Tama Art University. Before becoming a full-fledged voice actor, he worked at a talent agency, and was recruited by people in the voice acting industry who saw a performance by the Onigiri Skippers, a theater troupe he founded with his seniors from the lab party he attended in elementary school. During his first dubbing session, he made sounds out of flipping pages on the script because he had no experience as a voice actor at that time. The script for the first episode had four pages of long dialogues from the first page, and the sound director said that he would never have let him do the role if he had known he would talk so much. He made his voice acting debut in 1996 as a Mini 4 Fighter in Bakusō Kyōdai Let's & Go!!. The show was supposed to finish in a year, but due to its unexpected popularity, it became a long-running production, and he moved from the agency where he had worked as an actor to a voice acting agency. Since then, he has been active in a variety of fields including animation, games, radio personality, music, and stage.

After working at Sigma Seven, Morikubo moved to VIMS, an office affiliated with Arts Vision.

In 1998, he and voice actor Hideo Ishikawa started a music unit called "Anzu" (derived from the only fruit Morikubo could eat), and in 1999, they formed the band "AN's ALL STARS" with other band members. In August of the same year, he formed the band "Mosquito Milk".

In 2001, Morikubo made his solo debut under the Capcom Suleputer label, and in 2008, he debuted again under the Lantis label. In 2010, he formed "Buzzy→Bee" as a solo project, and in January 2015, he became the second DJ of the long-running bayfm program "KEIYOGINKO POWER COUNTDOWN JAPAN HOT 30".

In 2016, he received the Kei Tomiyama Memorial Award at the 10th Seiyu Awards. In 2020, he received the Personality Award at the 14th Seiyu Awards.

On August 31, 2018, Morikubo left VIMS. On September 1 of the same year, he established Add9th and assumed the position of its representative director.

Morikubo married fellow voice actress Yū Asakawa on February 22, 2007. In 2009, Asakawa wrote in a blog post that the two had amicably divorced, though exact dates of the divorce are undisclosed.

On July 4, 2014, Morikubo announced on his blog that he had gotten married that week, but cited a desire to keep details of the marriage private, including the identity of his wife due to her being uninvolved in the entertainment industry. On December 28, 2017, he revealed on an episode of his radio show The BAY☆LINE that he and his wife had welcomed a daughter earlier in the year. He later reaffirmed the news via Twitter.

He and Kentarō Itō call each other their best friend. Morikubo has been in charge of the stage music for the K-Show theater company, which Itō presides over, since its inception.

Filmography

Anime television
1996
After War Gundam X – Willis Aramis
Bakusō Kyōdai Let's & Go!! – Mini Yon Fighter
VS Knight Ramune & 40 Fire – Mito Natto

1998
Blue Submarine No. 6 (OVA) – Verg
Chosoku Spinner – Shunichi Domoto
Lodoss to Senki: Eiyū Kishi Den – Cecil
Sorcerous Stabber Orphen – Orphen

1999
Excel Saga – Norikuni Iwata
I'm Gonna Be An Angel – Raphael / Fuyuki Suzuhara
Sorcerous Stabber Orphen Revenge – Orphen

2000
Dotto Koni-Chan – High

2001
Captain Tsubasa – Shingo Aoi
Cyborg 009 (2001 series) – Cyborg 002 / Jet Link
Rave Master – Hamrio Musica
Kai Doh Maru (OVA) – Raiko Minamoto
Kikaider 01: The Animation (OVA) – Kikaider 01 / Ichiro
Prétear – Gō
The Prince of Tennis – Akaya Kirihara

2002
Cheeky Angel – Gakusan Takao
GetBackers – Ginji Amano
Naruto – Shikamaru Nara
Tokyo Underground – Kashin

2003
Ikki Tousen – Saji Genpō
The Boy with the Guitar: Kikaider vs Inazuman (OVA) – Kikaider 01 / Ichiro
Zatch Bell! – Haruhiko
Matantei Loki Ragnarok – Thor/Narugami
Papuwa – Sōji Okita, Tezuka, Umigishi

2004
Major – Honda/Shigeno Goro
Melody of Oblivion – Hol
Samurai Champloo – Hankichi
Samurai Gun – Ichimatsu

2005
Boku wa Imōto ni Koi o Suru (OVA) – Yori
Fuyu no Semi (OVA) – Seinoshin Aizawa
Ichigo 100% – Sawayaka (OVA Character episode 3)
2006
D.Gray-Man – Jasdero
Nerima Daikon Brothers – Ichirō
Yamato Nadeshiko Shichi Henge – Kyohei Takano

2007
Detective Conan – Kanji Kojima (Ep 476–477)
Hayate the Combat Butler – Fighter
Naruto: Shippuden – Shikamaru Nara
Saiunkoku Monogatari Second Series – Riku Seiga

2008
Amatsuki – Tsuyukusa

2009
11 Eyes – Takahisa Tajima
Asura Cryin' – Reishiro Saeki

2010
Bakuman – Koji Makaino, A.K.A. Koogy
Bleach – Tensa Zangetsu
Hakuōki series – Okita Souji

2011
Bakuman 2 – Makaino Koji
Cardfight!! Vanguard – Taishi Miwa
Hakuōki Sekkaroku (OVA) – Okita Souji
Nurarihyon no Mago – Akifusa Keikain
Persona 4: The Animation – Yosuke Hanamura

2012
Area no Kishi – Goto Goro
Daily Lives of High School Boys – Takahiro Matsumoto
Magi: The Labyrinth of Magic – Sharrkan
The New Prince of Tennis – Akaya Kirihara

2013
Magi: The Kingdom of Magic – Sharrkan
Meganebu! – Shinji Hachimine
Pretty Rhythm: Rainbow Live – DJ. Coo/Rei Kurokawa
Samurai Flamenco – Souichi Aoshima
Uta no Prince-sama Maji Love 2000% – Reiji Kotobuki
Yowamushi Pedal – Yūsuke Makishima

2014
Bakumatsu Rock – Kogorō Katsura
Daitoshokan no Hitsujikai – Ikkei Takamine
Jinsei – Asano
Love Stage – Kojirō Ryūzaki
Persona 4: The Golden Animation – Yosuke Hanamura
Momo Kyun Sword – Sarugami
One Piece – Bartolomeo
Yowamushi Pedal: Grande Road – Yūsuke Makishima

2015
Classroom Crisis – Kaito Sera
Cute High Earth Defense Club LOVE! – Kou Kinosaki
Kamisama Hajimemashita◎ – Ookuninushi
Uta no Prince-sama Maji Love Revolutions – Reiji Kotobuki
Diamond no Ace Second Season – Umemiya Seiichi
Star-Myu – Kyoji Akatsuki
Miss Monochrome The Animation – DJ Colourful
Diabolik Lovers More, Blood – Shin Tsukinami

2016
B-Project: Kodou*Ambitious — Hikaru Osari
First Love Monster — Tomu Kaneko
JoJo's Bizarre Adventure: Diamond Is Unbreakable — Akira Otoishi, Red Hot Chili Pepper
Uta no Prince-sama Maji LOVE Legend Star — Reiji Kotobuki
Saiki Kusuo no Psi-nan — Uryoku "Kouta Nakanishi" Chouno

2017
Hand Shakers — Makihara
Star-Myu: High School Star Musical 2 — Kyoji Akatsuki
Code: Realize − Guardian of Rebirth — Impey Barbicane
Boruto: Naruto Next Generations – Shikamaru Nara
Yowamushi Pedal: New Generation – Yūsuke Makishima
Crayon Shin-chan Gaiden: Omocha Wars — MC (Ep.9)

2018
Hakyu Hoshin Engi – Seikyo Doutoku Shinkun
Yowamushi Pedal: Glory Line – Yūsuke Makishima
Magical Girl Ore – Konami Yamo
Isekai Izakaya "Nobu" – Nikolaus
Ace Attorney Season 2 – Takamasa Moroheiya (Richard Wellington)
Thus Spoke Kishibe Rohan (OVA) – Akira Otoshi

2019
B-Project: Zecchō Emotion – Hikaru Osari
Namu Amida Butsu!: Rendai Utena – Shakanyorai
Demon Lord, Retry! – Zero Kirisame
Ensemble Stars! – Makoto Yūki
Demon Slayer: Kimetsu no Yaiba – Spider Demon (older brother)
Dr. Stone – Shamil Volkov
Black Clover – Zagred (Kotodama Magic Devil)

2020
Sorcerous Stabber Orphen – Orphen

2021
I-Chu: Halfway Through the Idol – Kururugi Satsuki
WAVE!! Surfing Yappe!! – Sōichirō William Mori
Sorcerous Stabber Orphen: Battle of Kimluck – Orphen
Tokyo Revengers – Tetta Kisaki
World Trigger Season 3 – Kazuma Satomi

2022
In the Land of Leadale – Luvrogue
Shadowverse Flame – Gentleman
Eternal Boys – Sawao Soda

2023
Sorcerous Stabber Orphen: Chaos in Urbanrama – Orphen
Tōsōchū: The Great Mission – Sōya Tomura

Anime films
Spriggan (1998) – Yu Ominae
Pokémon the First Movie (1998) – Young Mewtwo
Final Fantasy VII Advent Children (2005) – Kadaj
Fairy Tail the Movie: The Phoenix Priestess (2012) – Dyst
Hakuōki Dai-isshō Kyoto Ranbu (2013) – Okita Souji
Hakuōki Dai-nishō Shikon Sōkyū (2014) – Okita Souji
The Last: Naruto the Movie (2014) – Shikamaru Nara
Boruto: Naruto the Movie (2015) – Shikamaru Nara
Mazinger Z: Infinity (2018) – Koji Kabuto
WAVE!! Surfing Yappe!! (2020) – Sōichirō William Mori
Ensemble Stars!! Road to Show!! (2022) – Makoto Yūki
Fate/strange Fake: Whispers of Dawn (2023) – Caster

Video games
1998
Super Adventure Rockman – Heatman, Quickman

1999
Spriggan: Lunar Verse – Yu Ominae

2000
Grandia II – Ryudo
Rockman X5 – X, Dynamo
Sorcerous Stabber Orphen – Orphen

2001
Apocripha/0 – Seles
Jak and Daxter: The Precursor Legacy (Japanese dubbed version) – Jak
Rockman X6 – X, Dynamo

2002
Tokimeki Memorial Girl's Side – Chiharu Aoki

2003
Rockman X7 – X

2004
Jak II (Japanese dubbed version) – Jak

2005
Memories Off 5 The Unfinished Film – Haruto Kawai
Shining Force Neo – Max

2006
Mermaid Prism

2007
Odin Sphere – Ingway

2008
11 Eyes – Takahisa Tajima
Hakuōki series – Okita Souji
Persona 4 series – Yosuke Hanamura
White Knight Chronicles – Osmund

2009
Jak and Daxter: The Lost Frontier (Japanese dubbed version) – Jak

2010
NieR RepliCant – Tyrann
Shin Megami Tensei: Devil Children Black and Red – Kai Setsuna

2011
Final Fantasy Type-0 – Naghi Minatsuchi
Tales of Xillia – Ivar

2012
Tales of Xillia 2 – Ivar
Uta no Prince-sama Debut – Reiji Kotobuki

2013
Daitoshokan no Hitsujikai – Ikkei Takamine
JoJo's Bizarre Adventure: All Star Battle – Akira Otoishi
Uta no Prince-sama All Star – Reiji Kotobuki
Uta no Prince-sama Music 2 – Reiji Kotobuki

2014
Bakumatsu Rock – Kogorō Katsura
Code:Realize ~Sousei no Himegimi~ – Impey Barbicane
Gakuen Heaven 2: Double Scramble – Eiji Sonoda

2015
I-Chu – Kururugi Satsuki
Ensemble Stars! – Makoto Yuuki
JoJo's Bizarre Adventure: Eyes of Heaven – Akira Otoishi
Mighty No. 9 – Aviator
Uta no Prince-sama All Star After Secret – Reiji Kotobuki
Yowamushi Pedal High Cadence To Tomorrow – Yūsuke Makishima

2016
World of Final Fantasy – Cid

2017
Phantasy Star Online 2 – Elmir

2018
BlazBlue: Cross Tag Battle – Yosuke Hanamura 
Fire Emblem Heroes – Canas
Granblue Fantasy - Spinnah, Hamsa

2019
Saint Seiya Awakening- Saggitarus Aiolos
Arknights- Elysium
Super Robot Wars T - Koji Kabuto

2021
Rune Factory 5 – Lucas
Super Robot Wars 30 - Koji Kabuto

2022
Tactics Ogre: Reborn – Oz Moh Glacius

2023
Master Detective Archives: Rain Code – Aphex Logan

Drama CDs
... Virgin Love – Kazuki
Ao no Kiseki series 5: Persona Non Grata – Majera
Be My Princess – Prince Keith
Code:Realize ~Sousei no Himegimi~ as Impey Barbicane
Gaki no Ryoubun series 2–5, Kaoru Nitta
Hana-Kimi – Shuichi Nakatsu
Junjou Boy series 1–2, Ritsu Asaka
Kageki series 1–5, Shikyuriru/Shiki
Mars – Rei Kashino
Sakurazawa vs Hakuhou series 2: Houkengo no Nayameru Kankei – Katsumi Hirose
SEVENTH HEAVEN – Kanade
Superior – Exa
WRITERZ – Hyoma Kiritani

Tokusatsu
Zyuden Sentai Kyoryuger Returns: Hundred Years After (2014) – Remorseful Knight Arslevan

Dubbing

Live-action
Eddie Peng
Tai Chi 0 – Fang Zi Jing
Tai Chi Hero – Fang Zi Jing
The Bodyguard – Cop #2
Call of Heroes – Ma Fung
Wu Kong – Sun Wukong
The Rescue – Gao Qian
American Assassin – Mitch Rapp (Dylan O'Brien)
The Batman – Thomas Wayne (Luke Roberts)
Bones – James Aubrey (John Boyd)
Cinderella – Romesh (Romesh Ranganathan)
Criminal Activities – Noah (Dan Stevens)
Criminal Minds – Spencer Reid (Matthew Gray Gubler)
Final Destination 3 – Ian McKinley (Kris Lemche)
The Gilded Age – Oscar van Rhijn (Blake Ritson)
His Dark Materials – Pantalaimon (Kit Connor)
Houdini & Doyle – Harry Houdini (Michael Weston)
A Lot like Love – Oliver Martin (Ashton Kutcher)
Martial Arts of Shaolin – Lin Zhi-ming (Jet Li)
My First Wedding – Nick (Kenny Doughty)
Nerve – Ian/Sam (Dave Franco)
Peaceful – Benjamin (Benoît Magimel)
Peter Rabbit 2: The Runaway – Tom Kitten
Shane (New Era Movies edition) – Joe Starrett (Van Heflin)
The Time Traveler's Wife – Gomez (Desmin Borges)

Animation
The Nut Job 2: Nutty by Nature – Surly
Playmobil: The Movie – Rex Dasher

Solo discography

Albums
 is the first solo album by Showtaro Morikubo, released in 2001. "The Answer" and "Moon Light" were the album's promotional tracks, being used in the video game series Rockman X as the opening themes to Rockman X6. "The Answer" appeared as the album's only single, paired with the B-side "Happy Monday Man". The concert for this album – later released on DVD and included the promotional video for "The Answer" – is entitled "Showtaro Morikubo Live House Tour '01 ~Okubyō Mono no G Kōi~" (臆病者のG行為 lit. "G Conduct of a Coward").

 Build Up!!! [鍛]
 Power
 G Kōi (G行為 lit. "G Conduct")
 Karada Kensa (身体検査 lit. "Physical Examination")
 Rainy Day
 The Answer
 Hedgehog Peter
 Okubyō Mono (臆病者 lit. "Coward")
 Moon Light
 End of the Sky

kyo (叫〜kyo〜 lit. "exclaim")

 叫〜kyo〜
 Key
 dizzy candy
 DoPaMiNe
 My Destination
 Crazy night
 Never surrender
 Home sweet home
 Parallel World
 Catharsis-Dinner
 Whenever I go
 UNDER CONSTRUCTION
 Ride Free
 never ends...

rin (凛〜rin〜 lit. "frigid)

 Introduction Rin
 Let's get started
 Cloudy sky
 D.I.G.
 MIRROR
 〜interlude〜 「Detox」
 Fatboy
 nothing to lose
 gravIty
 Stand down
 Water in the tub
 Mr.CLOWN

Solo singles
The Answer
being the TRY
Lazy Mind
Ride Free
Parallel World
Stand down
Mr.CLOWN
CHAIN REACTION
TRIBALISM ～sunrise side～
TRIBALISM ～sunset side～
Focus
PHANTOM PAIN
TRUTH

Other discography

Albums
Hard Spirit is an album released from one of Morikubo's most popular voice actor units, Heart-beat, in which he paired up with fellow voice actor Hiroki Takahashi. The album spawned two singles, "Shootin' Stars" and "Continued". This album was also featured in a three part live action series, "Cross Chord", a drama starring both voice actors as the lead characters. In addition to the main album, both Morikubo and Takahashi released separate albums (titled Show and Hero for each artist, respectively) containing solo versions of the Hard Spirit songs, along with two exclusively solo tracks, each (both of which are also included on "Hard Spirit"). Morikubo sings alone in "Hurry Up Drive" and "Change or Never change", and Takahashi's solos are "Thanks for..." and "Believe me".

 Cross Chord
 Shootin' Stars (Movie Version)
 Continued (Movie Version)
 Hurry Up Drive
 Change or Never Change
 Thanks for...
 Believe Me
 Shootin' Stars (Single Version)
 Continued (Single Version)

Singles
CONTINUED
Shootin' stars

Notable songs
"Moon Light", used in Rockman X6 as the main opening theme.
"The Answer", used as a second opening theme for the aforementioned game.
"Lazy Mind", used as the ending theme for Rockman X7. It is still heard in the English release of the game, but is instrumental only.
"Begin the Try" (begin the TRY), used as the second ending theme to the anime Rockman.EXE.

DVD 
Showtaro Morikubo Okubyō Mono no G Kōi Live House Tour '01
Cross Chord (Volumes 1–3)

Awards

References

External links 
 
 
Showtaro Morikubo at GamePlaza-Haruka Voice Acting Database 
Showtaro Morikubo at Hitoshi Doi's Seiyuu Database

1974 births
Living people
I'm Enterprise voice actors
Japanese male pop singers
Japanese male video game actors
Japanese male voice actors
Male voice actors from Tokyo Metropolis
Musicians from Hachiōji, Tokyo
Singers from Tokyo
Tama Art University alumni
Voice actors from Hachiōji, Tokyo
20th-century Japanese male actors
21st-century Japanese male actors
21st-century Japanese singers
21st-century Japanese male singers